The 1995 South American Rugby Championship was the 19th edition of the competition of the leading national Rugby Union teams in South America.

The tournament wasn't played in a host country, but in different venues in each countries participating.

Argentina won the tournament. Brazil didn't participate.

Standings 

{| class="wikitable"
|-
!width=165|Team
!width=40|Played
!width=40|Won
!width=40|Drawn
!width=40|Lost
!width=40|For
!width=40|Against
!width=40|Difference
!width=40|Pts
|- bgcolor=#ccffcc align=center
|align=left| 
|3||3||0||0||233||49||+ 184||6
|- align=center
|align=left| 
|3||2||0||1||116||77||+ 39||4
|- align=center
|align=left| 
|3||1||0||2||40||123||- 83||2
|- align=center
|align=left| 
|3||0||0||3||35||175||- 140||0
|}

Results

References

1993
1995 rugby union tournaments for national teams
1995 in Argentine rugby union
rugby union
rugby union
rugby union